William Baird   (11 January 1803, in Eccles, Berwickshire – 27 January 1872) was a Scottish physician and zoologist best known for his 1850 work, The Natural History of the British Entomostraca.

Biography
Baird studied at the High School of Edinburgh, before studying medicine at the universities of Edinburgh, Dublin, and Paris. He was a surgeon for the East India Company from 1823 to 1833, travelling to India, China and other countries, and taking a keen interest in those countries' natural history. He helped found the Berwickshire Naturalists' Club in 1829, and contributed regularly to its publications. Baird practised as a doctor in London until 1841, when he joined the zoology department of the British Museum (now part of the Natural History Museum). He is buried in the Kensal Green Cemetery, London.

Work
Baird's most important work, The Natural History of the British Entomostraca, was published by the Ray Society in 1850. He published many other papers on diverse topics, and in 1858 he published a popular Cyclopædia of the Natural Sciences. He was a Fellow of the Linnean Society, a member of the Imperial and Royal Botanical Society of Vienna and a Fellow of the Royal Society.

See also
Entomostraca

References

External links

Natural History of British Entomostraca, Biodiversity Heritage Library
 

1803 births
1872 deaths
19th-century Scottish scientists
19th-century British zoologists
People from Berwickshire
People educated at the Royal High School, Edinburgh
Alumni of the University of Edinburgh Medical School
Alumni of Trinity College Dublin
University of Paris alumni
British carcinologists
British East India Company civil servants
Fellows of the Royal Society
Fellows of the Linnean Society of London
19th-century Scottish medical doctors
Scottish naturalists
Scottish encyclopedists
Scottish zoologists
Burials at Kensal Green Cemetery
British expatriates in France